Upper Bank railway station served the city of Swansea, West Glamorgan, Wales from 1871 to the 1960s on the Swansea Vale Railway.

History 
The station opened in September 1863 by the Swansea Vale Railway. The line was taken over by the Midland Railway in 1876. The station closed to passengers on 25 September 1950 and closed completely in the 1960s. By 1985, the only trace left was the section preserved by the Swansea Vale Railway Society. In 2007, Swansea Council decided to redevelop the area and by 2010 there was no trace left.

References

External links 

Disused railway stations in Swansea
Former Midland Railway stations
Railway stations in Great Britain opened in 1863
Railway stations in Great Britain closed in 1950
1863 establishments in Wales